Nikopol (historically ,) is a town in northern Bulgaria, the administrative center of Nikopol Municipality, part of Pleven Province, on the right bank of the Danube river,  downstream from the Danube’s confluence with the Osam river. It spreads at the foot of steep chalk cliffs along the Danube and up a narrow valley.

History
In Roman times, it was a village in the province of Moesia, first mentioned in 169. After the decline of the Roman Empire, the town turned out to be located at the northern border of the Byzantine Empire. In 1059, it was named Nicopolis, Greek for "City of Victory". During most of the Middle Ages, it was part of the Bulgarian Empire from its foundation in 681. After the fall of Tarnovo in 1393, the last Bulgarian Tsar Ivan Shishman defended what remained of the Empire from the fortress of Nikopol, where he was captured after the town was conquered by the Ottomans in 1395. Nikopol is therefore sometimes considered the capital of Bulgaria during these two years. It was the site of the Battle of Nicopolis, the last large-scale crusade of the Middle Ages, in 1396. At the fortress of Nicopolis, the united armies of Christian Europe headed by Hungarian king Sigismund and various French knights were defeated by the Ottomans under Bayezid I and his Serbian vassal Stefan Lazarević.

Under Ottoman rule, Nikopol developed into an important military and administrative centre as a sanjak, with a strong fortress and a flourishing economic, spiritual and political life, until it went into decline during the 17th and 18th centuries. It was the centre of a district (kaza), but it was overtaken by Pleven as the regional centre of that part of the Bulgarian lands. Nikopol was captured by the Russians in the Battle of Nikopol in 1877.

Modern times
It is the seat of Nikopol municipality and provides services to the local villages. Nikopol was partially flooded by the Danube during the 2006 European floods, and is currently working on new town infrastructure to manage fluctuations in the Danube River.

The completion of a car ferry in 2010 has linked the town to Turnu Măgurele across the Danube in Romania, spurring local development, including the opening of new restaurants and the town's first hotel. Nikopol also serves as a port for tourist boats where visitors stop and have the opportunity to take a bus into the nearby city of Pleven, or spend the afternoon in Nikopol.

The fifth-largest nature park in Bulgaria, Persina Natural Park, lies partially in Nikopol. Persina Natural Park is the only Bulgarian natural park on the Danube River, and contains marshlands, over 200 species of birds, 475 species of plants, and 1,100 species of animals. Based on the importance and uniqueness, Persina Natural Park has been declared a Ramsar site.

Tourist attractions in Nikopol include the ruins of the medieval fortress, the richly decorated 13th- or 14th-century Church of Saints Peter and Paul, the rock-hewn Church of Saint Stephen, the Bulgarian National Revival Church of the Dormition of the Mother of God from 1840, the Elia water fountain with an immured Ancient Roman gravestone featuring an epitaph, and the Vasil Levski museum house.

Twin towns — sister cities

Nikopol is twinned with:
 Halásztelek, Hungary
 Shakhty, Russia
 Zimnicea, Romania

Notable people
 Ivan Shishman of Bulgaria, the last emperor of the Second Bulgarian Empire, beheaded at Nikopol in 1395
 Jean de Vienne, French general and knight (13411396), died at Nikopol
 Jean de Carrouges, French knight (1330s1396), died at Nikopol
 Eve Frank, born at Nikopol (1754–1816), successor of her father, the Jewish claimed Messiah Jacob Frank.
 Joseph Karo, lived in Nikopol from 1523 to 1536

Honour
Nikopol Point on Livingston Island in the South Shetland Islands, Antarctica, is named after Nikopol.

References

External links

 https://web.archive.org/web/20051220013159/http://get.info.bg/visit/Dir.asp?d=0-13-PLEVEN-Nikopol
 http://www.encyclopedia.com/html/N/NikopB1ul.asp
 http://news.bbc.co.uk/2/hi/europe/4917820.stm#map
 https://web.archive.org/web/20131016090456/http://www.pleven.pro/weather/town.php?id=nikopol

Former capitals of Bulgaria
Towns in Bulgaria
Populated places on the Danube
Populated places in Pleven Province
Bulgaria–Romania border crossings